Tracey Towers refers to two twin buildings designed by architect Paul Rudolph, located in the Jerome Park neighborhood of the Bronx, New York City.  They are a predominant feature of the Bronx's mainly flat skyline.

History 
The buildings were created as a result of the Mitchell-Lama program, in addition, air rights of neighboring properties, including the MTA's on Jerome Yard, were purchased to allow for construction. Intended to be a luxury condominium, the buildings were completed in 1972 and opened in 1974 as subsidized housing. Combined, they have 871 units of various sizes, including one-bedroom and two-bedroom apartments. They were and remain the second-tallest cooperative housing development in the Bronx, behind Co-Op City, which is the largest of its kind in the world. Amenities however, have been on a slow decline in quality. In particular, tenants complain about the inconsistencies of the towers' boilers, and hot water is frequently shut without prior notice.

Architecture 
Tracey Towers consists of nine windowless concrete tubes built with grooved blocks and without any setbacks.  These blocks create asterisks which are divided by white slabs relative to each floor.  Unlike most buildings in the city, the windows and balconies are placed in between the gaps formed by the concrete tubes.  These tubes are also designed to spiral around a central keystone-like structure on a square-shaped plot. This design was chosen in order to align with Rudolph's vision for a futuristic obelisk.  This architectural style which the towers employ is known as brutalism, with some postmodern elements added.  The plot of land which it sits on is mostly resembles a trapezoid and takes up the majority of the land on the block.  The inside is similarly as complex; tenants and visitors alike are confused at the various openings and exits.  Although they may appear identical at first, one is taller and has three more floors than its shorter counterpart.  The complex sits on the Jerome Yard, which forces the heights of the buildings to differ by a significant margin.

Parking lot 
The parking lot of Tracey Towers maintains the same design as the towers proper.  About a story tall, an ear-shaped route which ramps downward toward the intersection at Mosholu Parkway and Paul Avenue is necessary for vehicles.  Cars loop around on a curved, slightly elevated route to enter the lot which starts on the intersection with Mosholu Parkway and Jerome Avenue.  The entire route is one-way only, and it goes under the East Tower at one point.  The route is mostly separate from the parking lot except for where cars exit/enter it.  A blue basketball court is present on the building.

MTA 
The Jerome Yard is located under the parking lot, which stores the rolling stock of the New York City Subway's 4 train.  A yellow, blocky maintenance building cuts through some of the parking lot space.  A stub of the IRT Jerome Avenue Line diverges from the main line heading west, sloping down until the tracks travel under the parking lot.  Another, human-accessible entrance exists at Paul Avenue below the exit ramp mentioned below.  It also handles vehicles.

Deterioration 
Like the rest of the complex, the parking lot has been tampered with by both natural and man-made sources.  This includes graffiti and vines stretching through all of the parking lot's walls.

Gallery

Coordinates 

 East Tower , at 20 W Mosholu Parkway
 West Tower , at 40 W Mosholu Parkway

References 

Residential buildings in the Bronx
New York City Subway infrastructure
Jerome Park, Bronx
Apartment buildings in New York City
Skyscrapers in the Bronx
Twin towers
Brutalist architecture in New York City
Residential buildings completed in 1972